The team normal hill/3×5 km competition of the 2015 Winter Universiade was held at the Sporting Centre FIS Štrbské Pleso on January 31. It consisted of three jumps per team from the normal hill and a 3×5 km cross-country races.

Results

Ski jumping

Cross-country

References 

Team